Prof. JUDr. Vladimír Mathern DrSc. (born December 13, 1928 in Brezno) is a Slovak jurist, law professor and the then rector of the Paneuropean University. From 1990 to 2003, he was a member of the Science institute of Comenius University. He is an author of many works and books.

References 

Slovak jurists
1928 births
Living people
People from Brezno
20th-century jurists